Aellopos blaini is a moth of the  family Sphingidae. It is found in Cuba, Jamaica, Hispaniola and Puerto Rico.

It can be distinguished from all other Aellopos species with an entirely black hindwing upperside by the lack of a transverse white band on abdominal tergite four. The hindwing upperside is entirely black.

The larvae feed on Rubiaceae species.

References

External links
Moths of Jamaica

Aellopos
Moths described in 1869
Moths of the Caribbean